"Postcard from Paris" is a song recorded by American country music group The Band Perry. It was released in March 2012 as the fifth single from the band's self-titled debut album. The song was written by group members Kimberly, Neil and Reid Perry with Jeff Cohen and Kara DioGuardi.

Critical reception
Billy Dukes of Taste of Country gave the song four stars out of five, calling it "a beautiful song that finds a fresh way to spell love."

Content
The protagonist has run into her ex while with her current boyfriend. This encounter triggers a flood of emotions leading her to realize that she will never feel as strongly for her boyfriend now, whom she compares to a postcard from Paris, than she did for her ex, who was the "real thing" to her.

Music video
The music video was directed by David McClister and filmed in New Orleans. It premiered on CMT on June 1, 2012.

Chart performance
"Postcard from Paris" debuted at number 52 on the U.S. Billboard Hot Country Songs chart for the week of March 24, 2012. It also debuted at number 100 on the U.S. Billboard Hot 100 chart for the week of May 19, 2012.

Year-end charts

Certifications

References
 

2012 singles
The Band Perry songs
Republic Records singles
Songs written by Kara DioGuardi
Song recordings produced by Nathan Chapman (record producer)
Republic Nashville singles
Songs written by Jeff Cohen (songwriter)
2010 songs
Songs about Paris